Matthew Jason Bloom (born November 14, 1972) is an American retired professional wrestler and professional football player. He is currently signed to WWE, where he is the head trainer at the WWE Performance Center in Orlando, Florida.

Championships held by Bloom over the course of his career include the GHC Tag Team Championship, IWGP Tag Team Championship and WWF Intercontinental Championship.

Early life
Bloom was born in Peabody, Massachusetts. He attended Peabody Veterans Memorial High School, where he earned three letters in football and basketball, two in track and field, and one in baseball. Bloom also attended Camp Tevya in Brookline, New Hampshire in the early 1980s, and went on to attend the University of Pittsburgh, where he played football as an offensive tackle and an offensive guard. Bloom graduated in 1996 with a degree in sign language. Following the 1995 NFL Draft, he was signed by the San Diego Chargers as an undrafted free agent, but was eventually waived by the team. He then became a schoolteacher, teaching mathematics and English to children with behavioral problems and deaf children at Revere High School. After rewarding his three most apt students with a trip to a professional wrestling event, Bloom, who as a child had aspired to wrestle professionally, met wrestler and wrestling trainer Killer Kowalski and expressed an interest in learning how to wrestle. Kowalski invited Bloom to attend his school, and Bloom opted to leave teaching and train as a wrestler.

Professional wrestling career

Early career (1997–1999)
Bloom wrestled his first match in the WWA on May 15, 1998, facing Tiger Ali Singh in a loss, during his brief time in WWA he wrestled notable names such as Sgt. Slaughter and Bart Gunn. In November 1998, Bloom made his NWA debut losing to Shawn Stasiak. During his stay in NWA, Bloom and Bull Pain challenged Nick Dinsmore and Rob Conway for the NWA OVW Southern tag team titles ending in a no contest. He briefly wrestled as Baldo, a gimmick given to him by referee Freddy Sparta that saw him wear a fur rug to the ring.

After being introduced to talent scout Tom Prichard by George Steele, Bloom was hired by the World Wrestling Federation (WWF). After receiving supplementary training from Dory Funk Jr., Bloom was assigned to the Power Pro Wrestling developmental territory in Memphis, Tennessee, where he wrestled as Baldo. While wrestling in PPW, Bloom won both the Young Guns Championship and the Heavyweight Championship, and engaged in a feud with Memphis mainstay Jerry Lawler, where he defeated him to become the inaugural PPW Heavyweight champion.

World Wrestling Federation / World Wrestling Entertainment (1999-2004)

Prince Albert (1999–2000) 
Bloom debuted on WWF television on the April 11, 1999 episode of Sunday Night Heat, saving Droz from a beating at the hands of Big Boss Man. Introduced as the personal body artist of Droz, Bloom was dubbed Prince Albert (a pun on the Prince Albert genital piercing), and together they formed a short-lived trio with Key. Droz and Albert continued to team together until Droz was paralyzed in October 1999, at which point Albert became the protege of the Big Boss Man. The duo separated in early 2000 following the debut of Bull Buchanan, who formed a tag team with the Big Boss Man.

T & A (2000) 

In March 2000, Bloom continuing to wrestle as Prince Albert, was recruited by Trish Stratus to form a tag team with Test, with Bloom having his name shortened to Albert at WrestleMania 2000's 'All Day Long' Event in a tag team match with Test against Al Snow and Steve Blackman.  The tag team, known as T & A, competed in the tag team division throughout 2000, feuding with rival tag teams such as the Dudley Boyz and the Acolytes. In December 2000, the team separated after Bloom attacked Test under the orders of Stephanie McMahon-Helmsley.

X-Factor; Intercontinental Champion and The Hip Hop Hippo (2001–2002) 

Following the dissolution of T & A, Albert had a brief feud with Test in January 2001. He competed in the 2001 Royal Rumble, being eliminated by Kane. Over the following months, he wrestled primarily at house shows and on Jakked and Sunday Night Heat.

In April 2001, Albert formed a stable called X-Factor with Justin Credible and X-Pac. On the June 28 episode of SmackDown!, Albert defeated Kane with help from Diamond Dallas Page to win the WWF Intercontinental Championship, his first and only title in the WWF. Albert later lost it to Alliance member Lance Storm on the July 23 episode of Raw, after several wrestlers interfered. In July, Credible left X-Factor and joined The Alliance. Albert and X-Pac continued X-Factor as a tag team until November, when X-Pac was sidelined with an injury.

In late 2001, Albert was nicknamed "The Hip Hop Hippo" as he began teaming with Scotty 2 Hotty. Upon the introduction of the Brand Extension, both Albert and Scotty were assigned to the SmackDown! brand. They disbanded on the April 4, 2002 episode of SmackDown! when Albert attacked Scotty after the duo failed to defeat Billy and Chuck for the WWF Tag Team Championship.

A-Train (2002–2004) 

Subsequently, he spent much of his time on Velocity until December 2002, when he joined forces with Paul Heyman and Big Show, which saw Heyman persuade him to rename himself to A-Train and debut new attire, the latter of which saw fans often chant "Shave Your Back!" at him during his matches due to his hairy torso. A-Train and Big Show lost to The Undertaker at WrestleMania XIX, after which A-Train continued the feud, culminating in a match at SummerSlam, which A-Train lost to Undertaker. A-Train then lost to Chris Benoit at No Mercy and, at Survivor Series, was on Brock Lesnar's team in a ten-man Survivor Series match in a losing effort to Kurt Angle's team, in which he was pinned by Bradshaw. He competed in the 2004 Royal Rumble match, and was eliminated by the eventual winner, Chris Benoit. After Benoit decided to wrestle Triple H for the World Heavyweight Championship on the Raw brand, General Manager Paul Heyman held a SmackDown! brand-exclusive Royal Rumble, to determine who would meet Lesnar for the WWE Championship at No Way Out. A-Train was eliminated by Eddie Guerrero, who went on to win the match. A-Train was traded to the Raw brand on March 22, 2004 before making his official Raw debut on June 7, losing to Chris Jericho. His last match was a loss to Val Venis on Heat.  Two weeks later, he was sidelined with a torn rotator cuff and was released from his WWE contract on November 1, 2004 before he could return.

All Japan Pro Wrestling (2005–2006) 

In March 2005, Bloom began wrestling for the Japanese All Japan Pro Wrestling promotion, adopting the ring name "Giant Bernard" (a reference to wrestler Brute Bernard). He went on to join the Voodoo Murders stable alongside fellow WWE alumni Chuck Palumbo and Johnny Stamboli. On October 18, 2005, Bloom unsuccessfully challenged Satoshi Kojima for the Triple Crown Heavyweight Championship.

New Japan Pro-Wrestling (2006–2012)

Various feuds (2006–2009) 
In January 2006, Bloom left AJPW and joined the rival New Japan Pro-Wrestling (NJPW) promotion. In April 2006, he defeated Yuji Nagata in the finals of the 2006 New Japan Cup. As a result of his victory, Bloom received a shot at the IWGP Heavyweight Championship. He unsuccessfully challenged IWGP Heavyweight Champion Brock Lesnar on May 3, 2006 in Tenjin, Chūō-ku, Fukuoka.

In July 2006, following the abdication of the IWGP Heavyweight Championship by Lesnar, Bloom entered a tournament for the title, losing to Hiroshi Tanahashi in the tournament final. In August 2006, Bloom took part in the 2006 G1 Climax Tournament, losing to Hiroyoshi Tenzan in the semifinals.

On March 11, 2007 in Nagoya, Bloom and Travis Tomko defeated Manabu Nakanishi and Takao Omori to win the IWGP Tag Team Championship. At the February 17, 2008 New Japan show, they lost the IWGP Tag Team Championship to Togi Makabe and Toru Yano. Following Tomko's departure for Total Nonstop Action Wrestling on a full-time basis, Bernard began teaming with former World Championship Wrestling wrestler Rick Fuller in another powerhouse tag team. On September 5, 2008, Bernard and Fuller betrayed Shinsuke Nakamura and Hirooki Goto to align themselves with Togi Makabe's Great Bash Heel stable.

In addition to wrestling for NJPW, Bloom also wrestled for their affiliate Wrestle Land as Rusher Road, where he was a member of the Roads stable until the brand's closure.

Bad Intentions (2009–2012) 

In 2009, after betraying Togi Makabe, Bernard and the rest of GBH left the stable to join Shinsuke Nakamura and form the new stable known as CHAOS. Bernard formed the tag team Bad Intentions with CHAOS partner Karl Anderson and together the two of them went on to win that year's G1 Tag League after defeating Apollo 55 (Prince Devitt and Ryusuke Taguchi) in the finals of the tournament on November 1. They went on to challenge for the IWGP Tag Team Championship, but their match with the defending champions Team 3D (Brother Ray and Brother Devon) at Destruction '09 ended in a double countout. In April 2010, both Bernard and Anderson left CHAOS when the stable turned on them.

Through NJPW's working agreement with Consejo Mundial de Lucha Libre, Bloom did his first tour of Mexico in May 2010, where he and Anderson managed to win six successive Two-out-of-Three Falls tag team matches in two straight falls, before he lost his final match of the tour on June 11 via disqualification. Upon his return to Japan, Bernard and Anderson defeated the teams of Seigigun (Yuji Nagata and Wataru Inoue) and No Limit (Tetsuya Naito and Yujiro Takahashi) in a Three-Way Elimination match on June 19 at Dominion 6.19 to win the IWGP Tag Team Championship. Bad Intentions made their first successful defense of the IWGP Tag Team Championship on July 19, defeating Seigigun and No Limit in a three-way "Dogfight". In late October, Bad Intentions entered the 2010 G1 Tag League, where, after three wins and two losses, they finished second in their block. This put them in the semifinals where, on November 7, they were defeated by eventual winners Yuji Nagata and Wataru Inoue. On January 4, 2011 at Wrestle Kingdom V in Tokyo Dome, Bad Intentions successfully defended the IWGP Tag Team Championship in a three–way match against Beer Money, Inc. (James Storm and Robert Roode) and Muscle Orchestra (Manabu Nakanishi and Strong Man). On May 3, Bad Intentions defeated No Limit to make their seventh successful IWGP Tag Team Championship defense, tying the record for most defenses, set by Hiroyoshi Tenzan and Masahiro Chono.

Bad Intentions made their record-breaking eighth successful IWGP Tag Team Championship defense on June 18 at Dominion 6.18 against Pro Wrestling Noah's Takuma Sano and Yoshihiro Takayama, and in the process also became the new GHC Tag Team Champions upon defeating Sano and Takayama for the title. After the main event of the show, Bernard challenged Hiroshi Tanahashi for the IWGP Heavyweight Championship, which Tanahashi said he would accept, if Bad Intentions beat him in a match for the IWGP Tag Team Championship, alongside the man he just defeated - Hirooki Goto. On July 3, Bernard and Anderson successfully defended the IWGP Tag Team Championship against Tanahashi and Goto. By winning, Bernard earned an IWGP Heavyweight Championship match against Tanahashi on July 18, but failed.

On July 23, Bad Intentions made an appearance for Pro Wrestling Noah, making their first successful defense of the GHC Tag Team Championship against the team of Takeshi Morishima and Yutaka Yoshie. On September 9, Bad Intentions became the longest reigning IWGP Tag Team Champions, breaking the previous record of 446 days set by Hiroyoshi Tenzan and Masahiro Chono in 2003. Bad Intentions made their second GHC Tag Team Championship defense on October 31, defeating Go Shiozaki and Shuhei Taniguchi at a Pro Wrestling Noah event. During New Japan's 2011 G1 Tag League, Bad Intentions suffered their first tag team loss in a year, when they were defeated by the Complete Players (Masato Tanaka and Yujiro Takahashi), but still managed to win their four other matches and advance to the semifinals of the tournament. On November 6, after defeating the Billion Powers (Hirooki Goto and Hiroshi Tanahashi) in the semifinals, Bad Intentions were defeated in the final of the 2011 G1 Climax by Suzuki-gun (Minoru Suzuki and Lance Archer). On November 12 at Power Struggle, Bad Intentions made their tenth successful IWGP Tag Team Championship defense against Archer and Suzuki.

On January 4, 2012 at Wrestle Kingdom VI in Tokyo Dome, Bad Intentions lost the IWGP Tag Team Championship to Tencozy (Hiroyoshi Tenzan and Satoshi Kojima), ending their record-setting reign at 564 days. They followed suit with their other title on January 22, losing the GHC Tag Team Championship to Akitoshi Saito and Jun Akiyama.

Return to WWE (2012-present)

Lord Tensai (2012–2013) 

On March 17, 2012, it was reported that Bloom had re-signed with WWE. Bloom publicly denied the signing; however, on the March 19 episode of Raw, he appeared in a vignette under the new ring name "Lord Tensai" (天災). On the April 2 episode of Raw, Bloom made his WWE re-debut as Lord Tensai, where he was accompanied by his follower Sakamoto before defeating Alex Riley. In the following weeks, Tensai went on a winning streak, scoring pinfall victories over lower card wrestlers and even main stars including John Cena and WWE Champion CM Punk.

On the May 21 episode of Raw, Tensai dropped the "Lord" portion of his ring name and his Japanese outfit worn during his entrance. Following this, Tensai began losing much more frequently throughout the rest of 2012, beginning with John Cena ending his winning streak before he also suffered a loss to World Heavyweight Champion Sheamus. His losing streak caused Tensai to often vent his frustrations by abusing and attacking Sakamoto, who eventually ceased appearing with Tensai. On the June 29 episode of SmackDown, Tensai defeated Justin Gabriel to break his losing streak and also qualify for a spot in the World Heavyweight Championship Money in the Bank ladder match at Money in the Bank, though the match was ultimately won by Dolph Ziggler. Over the next three months, Tensai's losing streak resumed, as he lost to the likes of Tyson Kidd, Sin Cara, Randy Orton, and Ryback. Tensai finally ended his losing streak on the October 5 episode of SmackDown, defeating Big Show by disqualification after Sheamus interfered. However, he would be back on the losing end the following week, after being defeated by Sheamus. On November 18 at the Survivor Series pay-per-view, Tensai took part in a traditional Five-on-Five Elimination tag team match, but he was the second man eliminated from his team, but not before eliminating Brodus Clay. In December, Tensai was demoted to a comedy act, with Santino Marella calling him "Fat Albert" before proceeding to defeat Tensai.

Tons of Funk (2013–2014)
On the January 28, 2013 episode of Raw, Tensai was tricked into wearing lingerie while participating in a dance-off with Brodus Clay. Two days later on Main Event, after being mocked for his lingerie dance, Tensai defeated Titus O'Neil in a singles match. Clay came out to support Tensai during the match and Tensai danced with Clay after the match, signalling a face turn. Following this, Clay and Tensai formed a tag team and they went on to defeat established teams such as Primo and Epico, Heath Slater and Jinder Mahal of 3MB, and Team Rhodes Scholars (Cody Rhodes and Damien Sandow), with the latter match taking place during the pre-show of Elimination Chamber on February 17. On the March 22 episode of SmackDown, Tensai and Clay were defeated by Team Rhodes Scholars in a tag team match after an interference from their associates The Bella Twins. Tensai (also now referred to by the name Sweet T) and Clay announced their official tag-team name "Tons of Funk" on the March 27 episode of Main Event, where they accompanied The Funkadactyls (Cameron and Naomi) to the ring in a losing effort to The Bella Twins with Team Rhodes Scholars in their corner when Nikki pinned Naomi after an interference by Cody Rhodes.

The two teams were originally booked to face each other in an eight-person mixed tag team match on April 7 at WrestleMania 29, but their match was cut due to time constraints. The match instead took place the following night on Raw, where Tons of Funk and The Funkadactyls emerged victorious. After nearly a month of in-ring absence, Tons of Funk returned on the June 6 episode of Superstars, defeating Primo and Epico. On June 24, Tensai and Clay competed in a Triple Threat tag team match to determine the number one contenders for the Tag Team Championship against The Usos and 3MB (represented by Drew McIntyre and Jinder Mahal), although The Usos would ultimately win the match. In November 2013, Tons of Funk began to show signs of instability once Clay started a storyline where he became angry and jealous of the debuting Xavier Woods. As Clay began to exhibit more heel-oriented tendencies, such as repeatedly attacking Woods after he had defeated Woods in a match, Tensai and the Funkadactyls slowly became alienated from him. At TLC: Tables, Ladders & Chairs, Clay faced Woods' partner, R-Truth, and continually assaulted Truth instead of going for a win, resulting in Tensai and the Funkadactyls leaving in protest and Clay subsequently losing the match. On the December 20 episode of SmackDown, Tensai defeated Clay in a singles match after a distraction from Woods and the Funkadactyls.

Retirement and trainer (2014–present)
After Tons of Funk disbanded, Bloom was taken off television and, in January 2014, began working in WWE's developmental territory NXT as a commentator under the new ring name "Jason Albert". On August 7, Bloom stated he decided to retire from in-ring competition and announced that he would begin working as a trainer in the WWE Performance Center, resuming his teaching profession. On March 6, 2015, Bloom was reportedly promoted to interim NXT head trainer following the departure of Bill DeMott. On May 19, Bloom was promoted to NXT head coach from his previous interim role.

Personal life
Bloom married Farah Louise on September 3, 2005.

At one point, Bloom had 28 body piercings, the first of which he received at the age of 14. His numerous tattoos represent his 8-year tenure in Japan.

Other media
Bloom has appeared in twenty video games under his various gimmicks, such as Prince Albert in WWF WrestleMania 2000, as Albert in WWF SmackDown!, WWF No Mercy, WWF SmackDown! 2: Know Your Role, WWF SmackDown! Just Bring It, WWF Raw, WWE WrestleMania X8, WWE SmackDown! Shut Your Mouth, as A-Train in WWE Raw 2, WWE SmackDown! Here Comes the Pain, WWE SmackDown! vs. Raw, as Giant Bernard in Fire Pro Wrestling 2, Fire Pro Wrestling Returns, Wrestle Kingdom and Wrestle Kingdom 2, as Willy Pearce in Wrestling Empire, and as Tensai in WWE '13 (as DLC) and in WWE 2K14. Bloom also appears as a trainer in MyCareer Mode in WWE 2K16, credited as Jason Albert, and WWE 2K17, WWE 2K18, and WWE 2K19 under his real name.

Championships and accomplishments
Impact Zone Wrestling
IZW Heavyweight Championship (1 time)
Elite Xtreme Wrestling
EXW Tag Team Championship (1 time)
New Japan Pro-Wrestling
IWGP Tag Team Championship (2 times) – with Travis Tomko (1) and Karl Anderson (1)
G1 Tag League (2007) – with Travis Tomko
G1 Tag League (2009) – with Karl Anderson
New Japan Cup (2006)
Nikkan Sports
Best Tag Team Award (2007) with Travis Tomko
Best Tag Team Award (2011) with Karl Anderson
Power Pro Wrestling
PPW Heavyweight Championship (1 time)
PPW Young Guns Championship (1 time)
Pro Wrestling Illustrated
Ranked No. 32 of the top 500 singles wrestlers in the PWI 500 in 2001
Pro Wrestling Noah
GHC Tag Team Championship (1 time) – with Karl Anderson
World Wrestling Federation
WWF Intercontinental Championship (1 time)
Wrestling Observer Newsletter
Tag Team of the Year (2011) – with Karl Anderson

See also
 List of Jewish professional wrestlers

Notes

References

External links
 
 
 
 

1972 births
American football offensive linemen
American male professional wrestlers
Chaos (professional wrestling) members
Faux Japanese professional wrestlers
Jewish professional wrestlers
Living people
People from Peabody, Massachusetts
Sportspeople from Essex County, Massachusetts
Pittsburgh Panthers football players
Players of American football from Massachusetts
Professional wrestlers from Massachusetts
Professional wrestling announcers
Professional wrestling trainers
San Diego Chargers players
WWF/WWE Intercontinental Champions
Expatriate professional wrestlers in Japan
20th-century professional wrestlers
21st-century professional wrestlers
IWGP Heavyweight Tag Team Champions
GHC Tag Team Champions